Buol (Bual, Bwo’ol, Bwool, Dia) is an Austronesian language spoken in North-eastern Sulawesi, Indonesia.

Phonology
Stress falls on penultimate syllable, with sequence of like vowels counting as one syllable. 

The consonants are as follows:

 occurs in loans.  are found in loans and a small number of native words, such as  'k.o. cricket',  'nine',  'bark slippers'.

 only occurs before , but there are near-minimal pairs such as  'fruit',  'leaf'.

 is pronounced  after a front vowel, as in  'tongue';  if not preceded, but followed by a front vowel, as in  'chin'; and  elsewhere. However, there is an exception with the sequences , where the first  is pronounced , as in  'face'.

References

Further reading

 

Gorontalo–Mongondow languages
Languages of Sulawesi